The 2008 Algerian Cup Final was the 44th final of the Algerian Cup. The final took place on June 16, 2008, at Stade Mustapha Tchaker in Blida with kick-off at 16:00. JSM Béjaïa beat WA Tlemcen 3–1 on penalties to win their first Algerian Cup.

Pre-match

Details

References

Cup
Algeria
Algerian Cup Finals